Miss Indonesia 2015 is the 11th edition of the Miss Indonesia pageant. The pageant has the theme "Beauty in Diversity"  It was held on February 16, 2015, at Hall D2 Jakarta International Expo, Jakarta, Indonesia. Miss World 2014, Rolene Strauss of South Africa attended the awarding night.

Maria Rahajeng as Miss Indonesia 2014 from West Sulawesi crowned her successor, Maria Harfanti from Yogyakarta Special Region. She will represent Indonesia in Miss World 2015.

Judges 

 Liliana Tanoesoedibjo, Founder and Chairwoman of Miss Indonesia Organization.
 Peter F. Saerang, professional make-up and hairstylist.
 Noor Sabah Nael Traavik, wife of the Norwegian ambassador to Indonesia.
 Wulan Tilaar Widarto, Vice Chairwoman of Martha Tilaar Group.
 Ferry Salim, actor, entrepreneur, and UNICEF ambassador to Indonesia.

Result

Placements

Fast Track Event
Fast track events held during preliminary round and the winners of Fast Track events are automatically qualified to enter the semifinal round. This year's fast track events include : Talent, Catwalk (Modeling), Sports, Nature and Beauty Fashion, Social Media, And Beauty with a Purpose.

Special Awards

Contestants 
Contestants of Miss Indonesia 2015 from 34 Provinces in Indonesia.

References

External links 
 Official site

Indonesia
Miss Indonesia